Bruno Graf (30 August 1953 – 15 May 2020) was a Swiss footballer who played in the 1970s and 1980s. He played as a defender.

Football career
Graf played most of his youth football by FC St. Gallen, with a short visit to FC Gossau, and advanced to the St. Gallen first team, who played in the Nationalliga A as an 18-year-old. During his first two seasons he played only three games and was therefore was loaned to Brühl St. Gallen in the second tier of Swiss football to obtain more playing experience. 

Following his return to his club of origin, things did not work out as Graf wished and therefore a few years later, in 1977, he moved on to Young Fellows Zürich. But he could not help the Young Fellows from suffering relegation to the Nationalliga B that season. Thus, for the following season, Graf signed for Chiasso. Here he became a regular starter for the team and stayed for three seasons.

Graf joined FC Basel's first team for their 1981–82 season under manager Helmut Benthaus. He played his domestic league debut for his new club in the home game at the St. Jakob Stadium on 15 August 1981 as Basel won 2–0 against FC Aarau. Between the years 1981 and 1983 Graf played a total of 43 games for Basel scoring one goal. 19  of these games were in the Nationalliga A, two in the Swiss Cup, two in the Swiss League Cup, seven in the Cup of the Alps and 13 were friendly games. He scored his first and only goal for the club on 30 September 1982 in the test game as Basel won 3–1 against German team SV Weil.

Following his time with Basel, Graf moved on to Wettingen where he played for three seasons. In 1986 he moved to Winterthur where he ended his active playing career.

Private life 
As a youngster Graf completed his apprenticeship as Typwriter mechanic. After his professional football career, he worked for a while in the insurance industry, but then he switched to advertising technology. Up until his retirement, he worked in marketing for the company Historika in Oberuzwil, after he obtained his business diploma while working for them. 

Graf married local girl Gabi Fantelli and they had twins. In 2011 their son Leandro lost his life in a motorcycle accident. Soon after, Bruno Graf was diagnosed with cancer. His daughter is quoted in saying: "My father was a fighter, he remained an optimist, full of all the joys of life, he enjoyed his retirement despite illness, with traveling and by meeting old friends". On 15 May 2020, after a s two-day stay at the St. Gallen Cantonal Hospital, he died in the presence of his wife Gabi and his daughter Vanessa Graf.

References

Sources
 Die ersten 125 Jahre. Publisher: Josef Zindel im Friedrich Reinhardt Verlag, Basel. 
 Verein "Basler Fussballarchiv" Homepage

FC St. Gallen players
SC Brühl players 
SC Young Fellows Juventus players
FC Chiasso players
FC Basel players
FC Wettingen players
FC Winterthur players
Swiss men's footballers
Association football defenders
Swiss Super League players
Swiss Challenge League players
1953 births
2020 deaths